Ó Cárthaigh was the name of  a Gaelic-Irish family located in Ui Maine, though apparently not members of the dynasty. As Carty, it is still found in County Galway and County Roscommon.

See also

 Muireadhach Ua Cárthaigh (died 1067) was Chief Poet of Connacht.
 Feardana Ua Cárthaigh (died 1131), Chief Poet of Connacht.
 Feardana Ua Cárthaigh (died 1131), Chief Poet of Connacht.
 Aodh Ollbhar Ó Cárthaigh (fl. 15th century), poet.
 Michael Carty (1916–1975), Irish politician.

References
 http://www.irishtimes.com/ancestor/surname/index.cfm?fuseaction=Go.&UserID=

Surnames
Irish families
Irish Brehon families
Surnames of Irish origin
Irish-language surnames
Families of Irish ancestry